Cadeia do Aljube is a former prison in Lisbon, Portugal, now serving as a museum.

Situated near the Sé Cathedral in the parish of Santa Maria Maior, the prison housed those convicted through the Ecclesiastical Forum until 1820, then women accused of common crimes until the end of the 1920s. From 1928 until its closure in 1965, political prisoners of the Ditadura Nacional and Estado Novo were held there. Famous former inmates include Francisco Miguel Duarte, Telo Mascarenhas and Mário Soares.  After this it was converted to hold common criminals and offices of the Ministry of Justice.

Museum
Since 2015, the building has been used as the Museum of the Resistance and Liberty. An inscription on the outside reads:

References

Year of establishment missing
Defunct prisons in Portugal
Museums established in 2015
Museums in Lisbon
History museums in Portugal
Prison museums in Europe